Thomas Christiansen (5 January 1920 – 12 March 1998) was a Danish diver. He competed at the 1948 Summer Olympics and the 1952 Summer Olympics.

References

1920 births
1998 deaths
Danish male divers
Olympic divers of Denmark
Divers at the 1948 Summer Olympics
Divers at the 1952 Summer Olympics
Divers from Copenhagen